is a member of the Japanese House of Councillors and of the Japanese Communist Party. He was elected to his position in the National Diet in 2016. He supports the restoration of animals, plants, and their habitats.

References

1979 births
Living people
Japanese communists
Japanese Communist Party politicians